The 2006 Abierto Mexicano Telcel was both a men's and women's tennis tournament on the 2006 ATP and WTA Tours that was played on outdoor clay courts and was held in Acapulco, Mexico. The tournament was held on February 27, 2006, and ended on March 6, 2006.

Finals

Men's singles

 Luis Horna defeated  Juan Ignacio Chela, 7–6(7–5), 6–4

Women's singles

 Anna-Lena Grönefeld defeated  Flavia Pennetta, 6–1, 4–6, 6–2

Men's doubles

 František Čermák /  Leoš Friedl defeated  Potito Starace /  Filippo Volandri, 7–5, 6–2

Women's doubles

 Anna-Lena Grönefeld /  Meghann Shaughnessy defeated  Shinobu Asagoe /  Émilie Loit, 6–1, 6–3

External links
Women's draws
Men's Singles draw
Men's Doubles draw

 
2006
Abierto Mexicano Telcel
Abierto Mexicano Telcel
February 2006 sports events in Mexico
March 2006 sports events in Mexico